Rättö ja Lehtisalo is an experimental rock-music band, featuring two members of the Finnish group Circle, Jussi Lehtisalo and Mika Rättö (who also performs with Kuusumun Profeetta). Their output is clearly influenced by krautrock acts such as Cluster, Neu! and Harmonia. They have also recorded as a trio with Finnish rock performer Kauko Röyhkä.

Discography

Albums
 Kopernikus hortoilee näkinkengässä (Ektro Records, 2003)
 Pari lepakkoa Transylvaniassa (Ektro Records, 2004)
 Ed Benttonin briljantti stabilismi tai taivaallinen kylpysaippua (Ektro Records, 2006)
 Röyhkä ja Rättö ja Lehtisalo: Hiekkarantaa (Ektro Records, 2009)
 UU mama (Ektro Records, 2010)
 Matematiikka (Ektro Records, 2012)

Singles/EPs
 Valonnopeus (Sähkö Recordings, 2005)
 Reverend Bizarre/Rättö ja Lehtisalo split 12" (Ektro Records/Full Contact, 2008)

Finnish musical groups
Musical groups from Pori